The Clarinet Quintet in B Major, Op. 34, is a clarinet quintet that was composed by Carl Maria von Weber from 1811 to 1815.  As with most of Weber's other clarinet compositions, the quintet was written for the German clarinet virtuoso Heinrich Baermann.

Structure 
The quintet is written in four movements.  A typical performance lasts between 25 and 30 minutes.

 Allegro
 Fantasia
 Menuetto, capriccio presto
 Rondo, allegro giocoso

External links 
 

Compositions by Carl Maria von Weber
Weber, Carl Maria von
Compositions in B-flat major